Steinbrücken Cave ("Stone bridge cave", no. 1623/204 in the Austrian cave register) was discovered by the Cambridge University Caving Club on the Loser Plateau in 1999. It is part of the large Schwarzmooskogel cave system, and is named after a nearby natural arch. The arch is in fact a former entrance to Traungold Cave (1623/231e) which has been developed into a convenient bivouac shelter for cave explorers.

Layout
There are over 300 question marks (unexplored leads) of varying quality in the cave.

The position of the first entrance is Alt 1812.40, .

The originally discovered entrance A is primarily used as a route to the deepest part of the cave, "Razor Dance", a narrow rift of over  extent. 32 pitches and climbs are required to reach the terminal sump.  

Most other explorations begin at entrance E, which leads through an awkward crawl to a  pitch that has a deposit of snow at the bottom most years.  From here extensive horizontal levels of Swings and Roundabouts, Treeumphant and Rhino Rift can be reached.  Descending  of the Gaffered series of pitches leads to another horizontal development called  The Underworld.  A further  of pitches leads to an extensive horizontal development called Subsoil. Subway Level, the lowest stratigraphical layer of the cave, can then be reached by descending  down the Four Pitches of the Apocalypse.

There are over a hundred caves in the vicinity, most of which connect into the Schwatzmooskögel System. Notable caves with significant development which link into it are Tunnock Shaft, Balkonhöhle, Kaninchenhöhle, and the Stelleweg-Schnellzughöhle System (via Kaninchenhöhle).

See also
List of longest caves

References

External links
 CUCC webpage of cave 204
 Sample logbook from year 2004

Caves of Austria
Limestone caves
Wild caves
Totes Gebirge